National HIV Testing Day may refer to:
National AIDS Testing Day (El Salvador), June 27, HIV/AIDS in El Salvador
National HIV Testing Day (United States), June 27